Garraways Coffee House was a London coffee house in Exchange Alley from the period where such houses served as important places where other business was performed. Its original proprietor, Thomas Garway, was already said to be the first person in England to sell tea prior to the house's founding, and when he began to sell it here in 1657 it became the first place in England to do so. The Hudson's Bay Company  conducted its first sale of furs at the coffee house in 1671.

Different kinds of merchants patronized different coffee houses, with tea merchants patronising Garraway's, as well as many investors in the South Sea Bubble of the 1710s. The establishment became famous as a sandwich and drinking room, it being said that the sandwich-maker spent two hours preparing each day's food.

The works of Charles Dickens include multiple references to Garraway's, and Daniel Defoe wrote of it being frequented by wealthy traders from the City.

See also

References

Coffeehouses and cafés in London
Former buildings and structures in the City of London
17th-century establishments in England
17th century in London
18th century in London
London Stock Exchange